The following outline is provided as an overview of and topical guide to the human brain:

Human brain – central organ of the nervous system located in the head of a human being, protected by the skull. It has the same general structure as the brains of other mammals, but with a more developed cerebral cortex than any other, leading to the evolutionary success of widespread dominance of the human species across the planet.

While the emphasis below is on physical brain structure, functional aspects are also included. Mind concepts (as in mind vs. body), and cognitive and behavioral aspects, are introduced where they have at least a fairly direct connection to physical aspects of the brain, neurons, spinal cord, nerve networks, neurotransmitters, etc.

Structure of the human brain

This major section covers the physical structure of the brain.

Visible anatomy

Basic structure
 Human brain
 List of regions in the human brain
 Lobes of the brain
 Brain
 Basal ganglia
 Brain stem including Medulla oblongata,  midbrain,  pons
 Cerebellum
 Cerebral cortex
 Hypothalamus
 Limbic including amygdala
 Neuroanatomy

Isolating the brain from other structures
  Note – in conducting brain research, information "where the other end connects" is critical to understanding neural connections, and ultimately how the brain functions. The delineation of the brain from other parts, while retaining the "this is connected to on the other end..." information is therefore a non-trivial brain mapping task.
 Central nervous system – consists of the brain, and the attached spinal cord. The brain roughly floats on top of the ventricular system, a shock absorbing area filled with cerebrospinal fluid (CSF) which also connects to and fills the entire Spinal canal. The spinal canal terminates about two-thirds down the length of the spine, at the lower side of the first lumbar (L1). L1 is the first vertebrae not to have an associated rib, located roughly at the normal to high belt level.
 Peripheral nervous system – consists of nerves outside the brain and spinal cord, where they are not protected by the human vertebral column, skull and the protective blood–brain barrier. The peripheral part of the nervous system is therefore directly exposed to blood borne toxins and much less guarded from mechanical injuries.
  Spinal cord – many neurons originate or terminate in the brain and extend down into the spinal column. The spinal cord itself is a bundle of a vast number of neurons, with a total diameter of about 1/2 inch at the brain, thinning to about 1/4 inch diameter at vertebrae L1.
 Neurons – vary in length from less than a millimeter to over a meter. The longest single human neuron currently identified extends from the tip of a toe, well over a meter, up to the spinal cord at L1. Neurons that both originate and terminate inside the brain itself can measure less than a millimeter.
 A single neuron typically has several inputs (dendrites) or sensors, a relatively long cord (axon) which typically branches many times, and has several outputs connecting to other neurons or muscle tissue. Neurons communicate information in a single direction from the input end to the output end.
 The spinal cord has three major functions:
 as a conduit for neurons communicating action information from brain outwards to motor muscles via motor neurons,
 as a conduit for neurons communicating sensory information, from the senses inwards to the brain (see also: Sensory neuron, Sensory receptor, Proprioception, and :Category:Sensory receptors),
 as a center for coordinating certain automatic reflexes.

Cranial nerves
 Many neurons connect to the brain on one end, with the other end connected to another neuron, with the outside (the brain) junction located within the spinal column. Other neurons bundles which are labeled cranial nerves, connect to the brain on one end, and to locations outside the brain on the other, without having a junction inside the spinal column. Cranial nerves are actually huge collections of vast numbers of individual neurons that have found common routes through the body. They branch several times into smaller bundles which eventually reach many endpoints. With one exception, the optic nerve, they are all considered part of the peripheral nervous system.
 Cranial nerve zero Controversial but commonly found nerve which is perhaps vestigial or may be somehow related to the sensing of pheromones.
 Olfactory nerve (cranial nerve 1) Smell. See also: olfactory receptor neurons
 Optic nerve (cranial nerve 2) Sight. See also: retinal ganglion cell
 Oculomotor nerve (cranial nerve 3) Eye movement (except rotation), including constriction of the pupil and maintaining an open eyelid.
 Trochlear nerve (cranial nerve 4) controls most eye rotation (with head still, look up, down, left, right).
 Trigeminal nerve (cranial nerve 5) provides sensation from the face and certain motor functions such as biting and chewing.
 Abducens nerve (cranial nerve 6) controls certain eye rotation. (It controls the lateral rectus muscle used to bring the pupil away from the midline of the body)
 Facial nerve (cranial nerve 7) controls the muscles of facial expression, and taste sensations from the tongue and oral cavity.
 Vestibulocochlear nerve (cranial nerve 8) transmits sound and equilibrium (balance) information from the inner ear.
 Glossopharyngeal nerve (cranial nerve 9) primarily receives sensation from the throat, tonsils, part of the tongue, heart, and stomach. Also sends information to larynx and pharynx to facilitate swallowing.
 Vagus nerve (cranial nerve 10) sends output to the intestines, innervates the heart, receives taste information, deep/crude touch, pain, temperature of outer ear, larynx (name is akin to vagrant, i.e. wandering...)
 Accessory nerve (Cranial nerve 11) controls specific muscles of the shoulder and neck. Modern descriptions often consider the cranial component part of the traditional accessory nerve to be more properly classified as part of the vagus nerve, leaving what is left to be called the spinal accessory nerve.
 Hypoglossal nerve (Cranial nerve 12) leads to muscles of the tongue.

Significant components
 Arcuate fasciculus – the neural pathway connecting the posterior part of the temporoparietal junction with the frontal cortex in the brain and is now considered as part of the superior longitudinal fasciculus. Damage to this pathway can cause a form of aphasia known as conduction aphasia, where auditory comprehension and speech articulation are preserved, but people find it difficult to repeat heard speech. In nine out of ten people with tone deafness, the superior arcuate fasciculus in the right hemisphere could not be detected, suggesting a disconnection between the posterior superior temporal gyrus and the posterior inferior frontal gyrus
 Broca's area region of the brain with functions linked to speech production
 Caudate nucleus  located within the basal ganglia is highly involved in learning and memory, particularly regarding feedback processing. Neural activity will be present within the caudate while an individual is receiving feedback. It responds to visual beauty, and has been suggested as one of the "neural correlates of romantic love”. Its associated with dysfunctional in persons having obsessive compulsive disorder (OCD). Where it is speculated the Caudate nucleus is unable to properly regulate the transmission of information regarding worrying events or ideas between the thalamus and the orbitofrontal cortex.
 Central nucleus of the amygdala serves as the major output nucleus of the amygdala and participates in receiving and processing pain information.
 Nucleus accumbens part of the pleasure center, is a collection of neurons and forms the main part of the ventral striatum. It is thought to play an important role in reward, pleasure, laughter, addiction, aggression, fear, and the placebo effect
 Pineal gland  a small endocrine gland in the vertebrate brain. It produces the serotonin derivative melatonin, a hormone that affects the modulation of wake/sleep patterns and seasonal functions.
 Ventricular system a set of structures containing cerebrospinal fluid (CSF) in the brain which bathes and cushions the brain and spinal cord within the bone that confines them. CSF is denser than the brain and may impact imaging. It is also implicated in Coup contrecoup injuries such as the very common "head-on collision" where both the front and the rear surface of the brain are often damaged when both the CSF fluid and the brain itself are involved in a high-speed whiplash sloshing motion.
 Triangular part of inferior frontal gyrus part of Broca's area that contributes to propositional (true/false) language comprehension. Lesions of the Pars triangularis lead to the loss of the ability to produce spoken or written language (expressive aphasia), vs inability to comprehend language or speak with appropriately meaningful words (receptive aphasia)

Microscopic level anatomy 
 Neuron (brain cell) and nervous tissue
 Classifying brain cells/neurons by type: place cell, grid cells, border cells, head direction cells, spatial view cells, pyramidal cells, granule cells also barrier cells, conjunctive cells
 Synapse, chemical synapse, electrical synapse, neurotransmitter, synaptic vesicle, active zone
 Cytochrome c oxidase There is a direct relation between this enzyme's activity and neuronal activity. It is used to aid mapping of regional brain metabolism in animals.
 Virtual microscopy – a method of posting microscope images on, and transmitting them over, computer networks. Technology has advanced where digitized images are approaching that which is visible to the trained human eye under a powerful optical microscope.
 Electromagnetic theories of consciousness – a controversial theory asserting that consciousness is physically located in the brain's electromagnetic field surrounding rather than inside the neurons.

Receptor cells
 What can be experienced in the conscious and unconscious areas of the brain, from outside its confines,   is largely informed by different types of receptor cells, their physical distribution throughout the body, and how they specifically encode information that is then conducted to the brain. "Sensation" itself however is a higher level function, most frequently formed from a large fusion or integration of many different individual receptor inputs.
 "Five senses" with a somewhat mystical, ethereal "sixth sense" fails to capture the very well understood range of how various receptor cells actually operate and what types of sensory information they actually encode.
 Receptor cells, which are highly unevenly distributed throughout the body, found in low through extremely high densities, include:
 Ampullae of Lorenzini respond to electric fields, salinity,  and to temperature, but function primarily as electroreceptors.
 Baroreceptors respond to pressure in blood vessels
 Chemoreceptors respond to chemical stimuli
 Hydroreceptors respond to changes in humidity
 Mechanoreceptors respond to mechanical stress and strain
 Nociceptors respond to damage to body tissues leading to pain perception
 Osmoreceptors respond to the osmolarity of fluids (such as in the hypothalamus)
 Photoreceptors respond to light
 Proprioceptors provide the sense of position
 Thermoreceptors respond to temperature, either heat, cold or both
  Electromagnetic receptors respond to electromagnetic waves

History of the human brain 
 Brain evolution
 History of neuroscience
 History of neurochemistry
 History of neuroimaging
 History of neurology
 History of psychiatry
 History of psychology
 History of neuropsychology

Brain development

This development section covers over time changes in brain structure. It includes normal development of the human brain from infant to adult, brain genetics (over many generations) and the evolution and adaptation of the brain over millions of years.

Normal development
 Neural development in humans
 Neuroplasticity  – changes in pathways and synapses due to behavior, environment, aging, injury etc.
 Nonsynaptic plasticity –  modification of neuronal excitability in the axon, dendrites, and soma of an individual neuron, remote from the synapse.
 Parental brain – the brain of a new parent, especially the mother, exhibit remarkable patterns. Displaying parental sensitivity towards infant cues, processing those cues and being motivated to engage socially with the infant, and attend to the infant's needs in any context could be described as nurturing behavior and is regulated by many systems in the brain. Hormones such as oxytocin, prolactin, estradiol and progesterone have been identified as important in the process. The medial preoptic area of the hypothalamus contains receptors for estradiol, progesterone, prolactin, oxytocin, vasopressin and opioids. These hormones are involved in activating nurturing behavior. Other areas include: amygdala, prefrontal cortex affect; amygdala and nucleus accumbens, (stimulus salience), nucleus accumbens and medial prefrontal cortex (attention), nucleus accumbens and medial prefrontal cortex (memory).
 The capacity for attachment, bonding and empathy are closely related to nurturing and parental interaction during formative years.  See in particular: Postpartum depression, Attachment theory, Human bonding, Interpersonal relationship, Interpersonal attraction, Interpersonal ties, Empathy, Mirror neuron, and Antisocial personality disorder.

Genetics
 Cognitive genomics genes and genome related aspects of health and activity of the brain. Intelligence is the most extensively studied behavioral trait. Includes genetic causes for many mental and neurodegenerative disorders including Down syndrome, Major Depressive Disorder, autism, and Alzheimer's disease.

Evolution
 Neuroanthropology

Typical brain function

This section covers typical brain function as opposed to atypical function discussed below.

Sensory input

Sight
 Cognitive neuroscience of visual object recognition – the ability to perceive an object's visual physical properties (such as shape, color and texture) and apply semantic attributes to the object, which includes the understanding of its use, previous experience with the object, and how it relates to others. Visual processing involves two neural pathways: the dorsal stream (how/where), which extends from the visual cortex to the parietal lobes and ventral stream (what), which extends from the visual cortex to the inferotemporal cortex. Four stages can be identified: 1. basics, including color, depth, and form, 2. grouping on the basis of similarity, providing information on distinct edges making up the visual form, and later, the figure-ground segregation 3. matching with structural descriptions in memory, and 4. semantic attributes that are applied, providing meaning, and thereby full recognition
 See cranial nerve section, particularly Optic nerve (#2) sight, Oculomotor nerve (#3) eye movement, Trochlear nerve (#4) eye rotation, Abducens nerve (#6) additional eye rotation.

Sound
 Culture in music cognition the impact that a person's culture has on their music cognition, including their preferences, emotion recognition, and musical memory. The neural processes of music memory retrieval share much with the neural processes of verbal memory retrieval, as indicated by functional magnetic resonance imaging studies comparing the brain areas activated during each task
 Aphasia – "speechlessness", a disturbance of the comprehension and formulation of language caused by dysfunction in specific brain regions.
 See cranial nerve section Vestibulocochlear nerve (#8) sound and equilibrium (balance) information from the inner ear. Note that the sense of equilibrium (balance) does not involve sensing sound.

Touch
 see portions of Sense, Sensory system, Sensory receptor, Sensation (psychology)
 Spinal cord, Peripheral nervous system and 12 cranial nerves (above) – the main conduits for "touch" sensation processed in the brain.
 Touch and physical sensation are enabled by highly refined receptor cells. See the Structure – Microscopic level anatomy section for more specifics.
 reflex arc – a neural pathway that controls an action reflex. In higher animals, most sensory neurons do not pass directly into the brain, but synapse in the spinal cord. This characteristic allows reflex actions to occur relatively quickly by activating spinal motor neurons without the delay of routing signals through the brain, although the brain will receive sensory input while the reflex action occurs.

Smell
 Olfaction – the sense of smell. Olfactory sensory neurons project axons to the brain within the olfactory nerve, (cranial nerve #1). How olfactory information is coded in the brain to allow for proper perception is still being researched and the process is not completely understood. However, what is known is that the chemical nature of the odorant is particularly important, as there may be a chemotopic map in the brain; this map would show specific activation patterns for specific odorants. When an odorant is detected by receptors, the receptors in a sense break the odorant down and then the brain integrates the odorant information back together for identification and perception.
 See cranial nerve section Olfactory nerve (#1) smell.

Taste
 See cranial nerve section Trigeminal nerve (#5) facial sensation biting and chewing, Facial nerve (#7) facial expression, taste from the tongue and oral cavity, Glossopharyngeal nerve (#9) sensation from the throat, tonsils, part of the tongue, heart, and stomach; swallowing and Vagus nerve (#10) sends output to the intestines, innervates the heart, receives taste information, deep/crude touch, pain, temperature of outer ear, larynx and Hypoglossal nerve (#12) leads to muscles of the tongue.

Other sensation
 Balance (ability), equilibrioception – the sense that allows an organism to sense body movement, direction, and acceleration, and to attain and maintain postural equilibrium and balance. Also: vestibular nerve
 Thermoception – sense of heat and the absence of heat (cold) by the skin and including internal skin passages, or, rather, the heat flux (the rate of heat flow) in these areas.
 Proprioception – provides the information on the relative position of the parts of the body. Proprioception and touch are related in subtle ways, and their impairment results in surprising and deep deficits in perception and action.
 Nociception, (pain) – signals nerve-damage or damage to tissue. The main function of pain is to attract attention to dangers and motivate avoidance.
 Other internal sense
Pulmonary stretch receptors found in the lungs and control the respiratory rate.
 Peripheral chemoreceptors in the brain monitor the carbon dioxide and oxygen levels in the brain to give a feeling of suffocation if carbon dioxide levels get too high.
 Chemoreceptor trigger zone is an area in the brain that receives inputs from blood-borne drugs or hormones, and communicates with the vomiting center.
 Chemoreceptors in the circulatory system also measure salt levels and prompt thirst if they get too high.
 Cutaneous receptors in the skin not only respond to touch, pressure, and temperature, but also respond to vasodilation in the skin such as blushing.
 Stretch receptors in the gastrointestinal tract sense gas distension that may result in colic pain.
 Stimulation of sensory receptors in the esophagus result in sensations felt in the throat when swallowing, vomiting, or during acid reflux.
 Sensory receptors in pharynx mucosa, similar to touch receptors in the skin, sense foreign objects such as food that may result in a gag reflex and corresponding gagging sensation.
 Stimulation of sensory receptors in the urinary bladder and rectum may result in sensations of fullness.
 Stimulation of stretch sensors that sense dilation of various blood vessels may result in pain, for example headache caused by vasodilation of brain arteries.

Integration
 Functional integration
 Functional integration (neurobiology) – the hypothesis that the integration within and among specialized areas of the brain is mediated by effective connectivity. For technical aspects see Function space, Topological space and Functional integration. For some observations on this type of approach and localization of function, see Neurophilosophy
 Multisensory integration is the neurological process that organizes sensation from one's own body and the environment, thus making it possible to use the body effectively within the environment. Specifically, it deals with how the brain processes multiple sensory modality inputs into usable functional outputs. See also Sensor fusion, Data fusion, and Information integration
 Lateralization of brain function
 Neurocomputational speech processing computer-simulation of speech production and speech perception by referring to the natural neuronal processes of speech production and speech perception, as they occur in the human nervous system. Neurocomputational models of speech processing are complex. They comprise at least a cognitive part, a motor part and a sensory part. A neural network can be separated in three types of neural maps (also called "layers), i.e. 1. input maps (in the case of speech processing: primary auditory map within the auditory cortex, primary somatosensory map within the somatosensory cortex), 2. output maps (primary motor map within the primary motor cortex), and 3. higher level cortical maps (also called "hidden layers".)

Affect
 Affective neuroscience
 Somatic marker hypothesis – mechanism proposed by Antonio Damasio Professor of Neuroscience at the University of Southern California and head of the Brain and Creativity Institute. Postulates that emotional processes can guide (or bias) behavior, particularly decision-making. When individuals make decisions, they must assess the incentive value of the choices available to them, using cognitive and emotional processes. When the individuals face complex and conflicting choices, they may be unable to decide using only cognitive processes, which may become overloaded. In these cases (and others), somatic markers can help decide. Somatic markers (probably stored in the ventromedial prefrontal cortex) are elicited by the relevant stimuli and then summed to produce a net somatic state. This overall state directs (or biases) our decision of how to act. Emotions, as defined by Damasio, are changes in both body and brain states in response to different stimuli. Physiological changes (e.g., muscle tone, heart rate, endocrine release, posture, facial expression, etc.) occur in the body and are relayed to the brain where they are transformed into an emotion that tells the individual something about the stimulus that they have encountered. Over time, emotions and their corresponding bodily change(s) become associated with particular situations and their past outcomes. According to the somatic marker hypothesis, when making decisions, the physiological signals (termed 'somatic markers') and their evoked emotion are consciously or unconsciously associated with their past outcomes and bias current decision-making towards certain behaviors while avoiding others

Mind / Body
 Philosophy of mind
 Body integrity identity disorder – a psychological disorder wherein sufferers feel they would be happier living as an amputee.
 Supernumerary phantom limb refers to a condition where the affected individual believes and receives sensory information from limbs of the body that do not actually exist, and never have existed, in contradistinction to phantom limbs, which appear after an individual has had a limb removed from the body and still receives input from it.

Memory
 Methods used to study memory – Memory is a complex system that relies on interactions between many distinct parts of the brain. In order to fully understand memory, researchers must cumulate evidence from human, animal, and developmental research in order to make broad theories about how memory works. Part of this work is performed by neuropsychologists who attempt to map specific behavioral deficits to regions of the brain where damage is known to have occurred. One of the fundamental problems this specific type of research is the difficulty with experimental control. Comparisons usually have to be made between individuals however exact lesion (or other damage) location, and topology, and individual differences cannot be controlled for. See also  Chunking (psychology), Object permanence, Memory and aging, Exceptional memory, and Memory disorder 
 Eureka effect –  also known as the "aha! effect, refers to the common human experience of suddenly understanding a previously incomprehensible problem or concept. It has been studied with EEG, ERP, and fMRI mapping. When participants experienced an Aha! moment upon viewing the answer to an unsolved riddle, activity in their right hippocampus increased significantly. This increased activity in the right hippocampus may be attributed to the formation of new associations between old nodes which will in turn strengthen memory of both the problem and its solution.
 Muscle memory – the retention in the brain of memories of certain muscle movements, often enabling those specific movement to be duplicated in the future. Also termed motor learning, it is a form of procedural memory that involves consolidating a specific motor task into memory through repetition. When a movement is repeated over time, a long-term muscle memory is created for that task, eventually allowing it to be performed without conscious effort. This process decreases the need for attention and creates maximum efficiency within the motor and memory systems. Examples of muscle memory are found in many everyday activities that become automatic and improve with practice, such as riding a bicycle, typing on a keyboard, rote typing in a bank personal identification number (PIN), playing a melody or phrase on a musical instrument, playing video games, or performing different algorithms for a Rubik's Cube.

Memory bias and distortion
 Choice-supportive bias the tendency to retroactively ascribe positive attributes to an option one has selected. Positive aspects tend to be remembered as part of the chosen option, whether or not they originally were part of that option, and negative aspects tend to be remembered as part of rejected options. Once an action has been taken, the ways in which we evaluate the effectiveness of what we did may be biased. It is believed this may influence our future decision-making.
 Fundamental attribution error – (also known as correspondence bias or attribution effect) describes the tendency to overestimate the effect of disposition or personality and underestimate the effect of the situation in explaining social behavior.
 Actor–observer asymmetry – discrepancy between attributions for one's own behavior and for that of others.
 Reconstructive memory – a theory of elaborate memory recall proposed within the field of cognitive psychology, in which the act of remembering is influenced by various other cognitive processes including perception, imagination, semantic memory and beliefs, amongst others. people view their memories as being a coherent and truthful account of episodic memory and believe that their perspective is free from error during recall. However, the reconstructive process of memory recall is subject to distortion by other intervening cognitive functions such as individual perceptions, social influences, and world knowledge, all of which can lead to errors during reconstruction.
 List of memory biases
 Confabulation – (false memories) a memory disturbance that is characterized by verbal statements or actions that inaccurately describe history, background, and present situations. Confabulation is considered "honest lying", but is distinct from lying because there is typically no intent to deceive and the individual is unaware that their information is false. Research suggests that confabulation is associated with dysfunction of cognitive processes that control the retrieval from long-term memory. Frontal lobe damage often disrupts this process, preventing the retrieval of information and the evaluation of its output. Furthermore, researchers argue that confabulation is a disorder resulting from failed "reality monitoring/source monitoring" (i.e. deciding whether a memory is based on an actual event or whether it is imagined.

Integration, computation & cognition

Sleep, dreaming and imagination
 Neuroscience of sleep – the study of the neuroscientific and physiological basis of the nature of sleep and its functions. Areas of research include: 1) What are the correlates of sleep i.e. what are the minimal set of events that could confirm that the organism is sleeping? 2) How is sleep triggered and regulated by the brain and the nervous system? 3) What happens in the brain during sleep? 4) How can we understand sleep function based on physiological changes in the brain? 5) What causes various sleep disorders and how can they be treated?
 Sleep and memory – Memory is the cognitive process whereby experiences, learning and recognition are recalled. Memory “formation” is a product of brain plasticity, the structural changes within synapses that create associations between stimuli. Stimuli are encoded within milliseconds, however the long-term maintenance of memories can take additional minutes, days, or even years to fully consolidate and become a stable memory (more resistant to change or interference). Therefore, the formation of a specific memory occurs rapidly, but the evolution of a memory is often an ongoing process. Memory processes have been shown to be stabilized and enhanced (sped up and/or integrated) by nocturnal sleep and even daytime naps. Certain sleep stages are noted to improve an individual's memory, although this is task specific. Generally, declarative memories are enhanced by slow-wave sleep, while non-declarative memories are enhanced by rapid eye movement (REM) sleep, although there are some inconsistencies among experimental results.
 Microsleep – an episode of sleep which may last for a fraction of a second or up to thirty seconds. Often it is the result of sleep deprivation, mental fatigue, depression, sleep apnea, hypoxia, narcolepsy, or idiopathic hypersomnia. For the sleep-deprived, microsleeping can occur at any time, typically without substantial warning. Microsleep episodes become extremely dangerous when they occur in situations which demand constant alertness, such as driving a motor vehicle or working with heavy machinery. People who experience microsleeps usually remain unaware of them, instead believing themselves to have been awake the whole time, or to have temporarily lost focus. They have been studied with fMRI and exhibit thalamic and cortical activity.
 Abstraction a process by which concepts are derived from the usage and classification of literal ("real" or "concrete") concepts, first principles, or other methods. "An abstraction" is the product of this process – a concept that acts as a super-categorical noun for all subordinate concepts, and connects any related concepts as a group, field, or category. Sleep may be associated with abstraction.
 Imagination the ability to form new images and sensations that are not perceived through sight, hearing, or other senses.

Wakefulness, awareness, attention
 Pre-attentive processing the unconscious accumulation of information from the environment. All available information is pre-attentively processed.
 Preconscious – information that is available for cognitive processing but that currently lies outside conscious awareness. One of the most common forms of preconscious processing is priming (psychology)
 Neural oscillation (redirect from Ongoing brain activity)
 Resting state fMRI (redirect from Resting-state brain activity)
 Default network  Also called the default mode network (DMN), a network of brain regions that are active when the individual is not focused on the outside world and the brain is at wakeful rest. During goal-oriented activity, the DMN is deactivated and another network, the task-positive network (TPN) is activated. The default network may correspond to task-independent introspection, or self-referential thought, while the TPN corresponds to action.
 Mindfulness
 Brain activity and meditation
 Research on meditation – Research on the processes and effects of meditation is a growing subfield of neurological research. fMRI and EEG, have been used to see what happens in the body of people when they meditate, and how their bodies and brain change after meditating regularly
 Yoga-nidra – conscious awareness of the deep sleep state. "Yogi sleep" is a sleep-like state which yogis report to experience during their meditations which has been studied scientifically.
 Maharishi University of Management – founded in 1973 by Maharishi Mahesh Yogi for "consciousness-based education" and the Transcendental Meditation technique. Effects of meditation and awareness practices have had scientific investigation.
 Kundalini yoga one form of yoga that has been studied with brain mapping. Structural changes have been noted.
 Swami Janakananda a tantric yoga and meditation teacher, founder of the Yoga and Meditation School in Scandinavia. He and several of his fellow teachers have participated in brain mapping research.

Logic, computation, and information aspects
 Cognitive neuropsychology
 Neuroinformatics – application of computational models and analytical tools to neuroscience.
 Computational neuroscience – covers and is focused on computational aspects.
 Neural network, Artificial neural network, Artificial intelligence
 Strong AI – artificial intelligence that matches or exceeds human intelligence, the intelligence of a machine that can successfully perform any intellectual task that a human being can.
 Bio-inspired computing, Natural computing – these include and go beyond artificial neural networks and include topics such as evolutionary algorithms, swarm intelligence, artificial immune systems, fractal geometry, artificial life, DNA computing, quantum computing, etc.
 Mind uploading – copying brain state into a computer.

Executive function
 Supervisory attentional system – a higher level system involved with a segment of general executive functions including elements of planning, inhibition, and abstraction of logical rules. It is speculated to be located in the left anterior frontal lobe which is associated with solving novel problems vs. problems that have pre associated sequences of resolution. Automatic attentional processes do not require conscious control and are triggered in response to familiar, environmental stimuli. These contrast with controlled attentional processes which require conscious control in order to respond to unique situations. The supervisory attentional system controls contention scheduling by monitoring the conscious, deliberate planning of actions, and novel situations that cannot be solved by previously learned schema (scripts of response). It is also activated when preventing error and when suppressing habitual responses is critical.  In addition to monitoring the activation of appropriate schema, and suppressing inappropriate schemata, the supervisory attentional system adjusts to solve problems that standing inventory of schema failed to resolve. It modifies general strategies to solve non-routine problems. If there are no relevant existing schemas a new schema may be created, assessed and implemented. The supervisory attentional system is slow, voluntary, and uses flexible strategies to solve a variety of difficult problems; the creation of a new schema takes approximately 8–10 seconds. This contrasts with the lower level contention scheduling system which regulates schemata processes for familiar situations. It is consistent in activating specific schema, automatic and much faster
 Metastability in the brain describes the brain's ability to make sense out of seemingly random environmental cues. It involves nonlinear dynamics and has been informed by methods by which computers model brain activity.
 Neuroscience of free will at least some actions – like moving a finger – are initiated and processed unconsciously at first, and only after enter consciousness.
 Neuroeconomics – studying human decision making using techniques from neuroscience, psychology, and economics
 Neurophilosophy – the interdisciplinary study of neuroscience and philosophy that explores the relevance of neuroscientific studies to the arguments traditionally categorized as philosophy of mind. For example, fMRI studies rely heavily on the assumption of "localization of function" whereby cognitive functions can be localized to specific brain regions. Many philosophers of neuroscience criticize fMRI for relying too heavily on this assumption. Other criticisms are levied against studies where brain damaged patients are studied for patterns of selective impairment and then inferences are made about the underlying physical and cognitive structures. See also the criticism section in Computational theory of mind.
 Neural basis of self the idea of using modern concepts of neuroscience to describe and understand the biological processes that underlie human's perception of self-understanding. Includes information on what areas of the brain are specifically associated with self-awareness.
 Mentalism – those branches of study that concentrate on mental perception and thought processes, in other words, cognition, like cognitive psychology. This is in opposition to disciplines, most notably behaviorism, that believe the study of psychology should focus on the structure of causal relationships to conditioned responses, that is to say behaviors, and seek to support this hypothesis through scientific methods and experimentation. For fringe areas see: Mentalism (philosophy), Mentalism, :Category:Theory of mind
 Animal cognition

Deception, lying and bias
Lie detection also referred to as deception detection, uses questioning techniques along with technology that records physiological functions to ascertain truth and falsehood in response. It is commonly used by law enforcement and has historically been an inexact science. Electroencephalography (EEG) measuring small voltage changes on the scalp has been utilized. See also Right to silence a common right afforded to most citizens throughout the world. In 2010 The Supreme court in India made all forms of brain mapping and lie detector testing a violation of the right to silence.
 See issues under memory, biases, confabulation, etc.

Motor output and behavior
Motor skill – a learned sequence of movements that combine to produce a smooth, efficient action in order to master a particular task. The development of motor skill occurs in the motor cortex, the region of the cerebral cortex in the brain that controls voluntary muscle groups. Covers developmental aspects (how children develop skills allowing coordinated movement) and influences such as stress, arousal, fatigue, and vigilance.
Muscle memory – the retention in the brain of memories of certain muscle movements, often enabling those specific movement to be duplicated in the future. Also termed motor learning, it is a form of procedural memory that involves consolidating a specific motor task into memory through repetition. When a movement is repeated over time, a long-term muscle memory is created for that task, eventually allowing it to be performed without conscious effort. This process decreases the need for attention and creates maximum efficiency within the motor and memory systems. Examples of muscle memory are found in many everyday activities that become automatic and improve with practice, such as riding a bicycle, typing on a keyboard, rote typing in a bank personal identification number (PIN), playing a melody or phrase on a musical instrument, playing video games, or performing different algorithms for a Rubik's Cube.
 Behavioral neuroscience

Sex differences, sexuality, and gender differences
 Brain size and weight are generally larger in males than in females.
 Sex differences in humans see Brain and nervous system for general sex differences. See also Sex differences in human psychology and Neuroscience and intelligence
 Orgasm positron emission tomography (PET) has been used to examine the correlation of orgasm and specific brain activity in real time.
 Infidelity (colloquially cheating, adultery, or having an affair) is a breach of an expectation of sexual and or emotional exclusivity expressed or implied in an intimate relationship. Helen Fisher, an anthropologist has used fMRI to assert there also is a neurobiological side to adultery.
 Love and sex – "We have two brain systems: One of them is linked to attachment and romantic love, and then there is the other brain system, which is purely sex drive."  See Helen Fisher (anthropologist). Sometimes these two brain systems are not well connected, which enables people to become adulterers and satisfy their sex drive without any regards to their attachment side. Fisher has also conducted fMRI research on love and lost love. Fisher asserts there are three identifiable physical systems that correlate with the following functions:
 lust – the sex drive or libido, also described as borogodó,
 attraction – early stage intense romantic love, and
 attachment – deep feelings of union with a long-term partner.
 See Development section for more information on attachment and bonding.
 Neuroscience and sexual orientation example  – A recent functional magnetic resonance imaging fMRI study has demonstrated that upon viewing of both heterosexual and homosexual erotic visual stimuli, only those images corresponding to the subject's sexual orientation produced hypothalamic activation patterns associated with sexual arousal. The response of heterosexuals viewing heterosexual adult videos showed the same pattern of sexual arousing neural processing as homosexuals viewing same-sex adult videos, while the viewing of the opposite orientation's images did not elicit the same response.

Higher level functioning
 This section could go on and on and is therefore only a cross broad sampling. Higher level brain function typically involves the coordination of several areas of the brain, typically simultaneously. Deficiencies in higher level brain functions are complex and multifaceted. See also the Integration area above.
 Curiosity, Interest (emotion)
 Linguistics speech, language, Reading (process), Reading comprehension, and Writing
 Symbol, Semeiotic, Semiotics, Symbolic (disambiguation), Symbolism (disambiguation), Abstraction
 Logic, Deductive reasoning, inductive reasoning
 Mathematics, Lists of mathematics topics, Science
 Art, Music, Dance, Play (activity), Sport, Recreation, Entertainment, Amusement
 Bloom's Taxonomy – a classification of the different objectives that educators set for students (learning objectives). Bloom's Taxonomy divides educational objectives into three "domains":
 Cognitive – knowing/head
 Affective – feeling/heart
 Psychomotor – doing/hands
 Learning, Education, Individualized Education Program (Individual Education Plan or IEP) – written, individualized educational objectives of a child who has been found with a learning disability.

Atypical brain function

This section covers the major known deviations from typical brain functioning with an emphasis on the resulting magnitude of overall human suffering.

Neurodegeneration and dementia
 Neurodegeneration – an umbrella term for the progressive loss of structure or function of neurons, including death of neurons.
 Multiple sclerosis – an inflammatory disease in which the myelin sheaths around the axons of the brain and spinal cord are damaged.
 Parkinson's disease – Early symptoms include shaking, rigidity, slowness of movement and difficulty with walking and gait. Later symptoms include cognitive and behavioral problems, with dementia commonly occurring in the advanced stages. The motor symptoms result from the death of dopamine-generating cells in a region of the mid-brain.
 Alzheimer's disease –  The most common form of dementia. Beginning with an array of symptoms including memory loss, as the disease progresses the individual often withdraws from family and society and requires 24/7 supervision. It is predicted to affect 1 in 85 people globally by 2050.
 Huntington's disease – caused by a mutation in the huntingtin gene (HTT) causing and array of symptoms including abnormal involuntary writhing movements, cognitive decline and psychiatric problems.
 Dementia – a serious loss of global cognitive ability in a previously unimpaired person, beyond what might be expected from normal. Neurodegeneration frequently results in dementia. Dementia can also arise from other causes. See: Multi-infarct dementia, frontotemporal dementia, semantic dementia and dementia with Lewy bodies.

Brain tumors and cancer
 Brain metastasis is a cancer that has metastasized (spread) to the brain from another location in the body. As primary cancer treatments such as surgery, radiation therapy and chemotherapy have become more effective in the past few decades, people with cancer are living longer after initial treatment than ever before. However, brain metastases still occur in many patients months or even years after their original cancer treatment. Brain metastases have a poor prognosis for cure, but modern treatments are allowing patients to live months and sometimes years after the diagnosis
 Tuberous sclerosis a rare multi-system genetic disease that causes non-malignant tumors to grow in the brain and on other vital organs. It is caused by a mutation of either of two genes, TSC1 and TSC2, which code for the proteins hamartin and tuberin respectively. These proteins act as tumor growth suppressors, agents that regulate cell proliferation and differentiation. While still regarded as a rare disease (1:12,500 in 1998 and rising), it is common when compared to many other genetic diseases. The invention of CT and ultrasound scanning have enabled the early diagnosis of many non-symptomatic cases. Individuals with mild symptoms generally do well and live long productive lives, while individuals with the more severe forms may have very serious disabilities. Detection of the disease should prompt genetic counselling. There is no known treatment at present however vigilant monitoring and early of treatment problematic tumors is very important. Cranial MRI can detect the cortical tubers and subependymal nodules associated with the disease.

Brain injury
 Injuries to the brain have for a long time been mapped, and kept with related information on loss of function, effectiveness of various forms of rehabilitation, and in some cases remarkable adaptation and recovery. see: Acquired brain injury, traumatic brain injury (TBI), Stroke, Brain damage, Frontal lobe injury and also the Federal Interagency Traumatic Brain Injury Research (FITBIR) database 
 Coma, Brain death, Coma scale, Persistent vegetative state, etc.
 Long-term disability and rehabilitation efforts are frequently associated with brain injury, disease, and related surgical and other interventions. See, for example: Cognitive rehabilitation therapy, Rehabilitation (neuropsychology), and Cognitive Remediation Therapy.

Seizures
 Epileptic seizure (Common term, a fit) – a transient symptom of abnormal excessive or hypersynchronous neuronal activity in the brain. The outward effect can be as dramatic as a wild thrashing movement (tonic-clonic seizure) or as mild as a brief loss of awareness. It can manifest as an alteration in mental state, tonic or clonic movements, convulsions, and various other psychic symptoms (such as déjà vu or jamais vu). Sometimes it is not accompanied by convulsions but a full body "slump", where the person simply will lose body control and slump to the ground. About 50 million people worldwide have epilepsy. Onset of new cases occurs most frequently in infants and the elderly. As a consequence of brain surgery, epileptic seizures may occur in recovering patients. See also Epilepsy and in particular the surgery section for details on specific brain regions associated with epilepsy.
 See also Orgasm which has been studied with fMRI

Stroke
 Stroke is the rapid loss of brain function due to disturbance in the blood supply to the brain. See also Cerebral infarction and Stroke recovery

Recreational drugs, alcohol and addictions
 Disease theory of alcoholism – problem drinking is sometimes caused by a disease of the brain, characterized by altered brain structure and function. For wider scope see: Disease model of addiction
 Long-term impact of alcohol on the brain
 Wernicke–Korsakoff syndrome – vitamin B1 (thiamine) deficiency usually secondary to hazardous alcohol use causing vision changes, ataxia, and impaired memory.
 Alcoholic polyneuropathy – primarily caused by chronic alcoholism, this is a neurological disorder in which multiple peripheral nerves throughout the body malfunction simultaneously. This nerve damage causes an individual to experience pain and motor weakness, first in the feet and hands and then progressing centrally.
 Other areas: Alcohol dependence, Delirium tremens, Alcoholic hallucinosis, Short-term effects of alcohol consumption
  Search "fMRI alcoholic" or "fMRI alcohol" for extensive coverage not yet available on Wikipedia
 Cannabis and memory – With legalization in some states and increasing use, the effects of cannabis on memory is a salient research topic. Efforts are focused on which areas of the brain are most significantly affected, for what duration, and what the effects are. See also sections in Long-term effects of cannabis.
 Gambler's fallacy a cognitive bias and fallacy that arises out the erroneous belief that small samples must be representative of the larger population. Its further divided into "classic" gambler's fallacy (Type I), when individuals believe that a certain outcome is "due" after a long streak of another outcome or Type II when a gambler underestimates how many observations are needed to detect a favorable outcome (such as watching a roulette wheel for a length of time and then betting on the numbers that appear most often). Functional magnetic resonance imaging has revealed that, after losing a bet or gamble ("riskloss"), the frontoparietal network of the brain is activated, resulting in more risk-taking behavior. In contrast, there is decreased activity in the amygdala, caudate and ventral striatum after a riskloss. Activation in the amygdala is negatively correlated with gambler's fallacy – the more activity exhibited in the amygdala, the less likely an individual is to fall prey to the gambler's fallacy. These results suggest that gambler's fallacy relies more on the prefrontal cortex (responsible for executive, goal-directed processes) and less on the brain areas that control affective decision-making. The desire to continue gambling or betting is controlled by the striatum, which supports a choice-outcome contingency learning method. The striatum processes the errors in prediction and the behavior changes accordingly. After a win, the positive behavior is reinforced and after a loss, the behavior is conditioned to be avoided. In individuals exhibiting the gambler's fallacy, this choice-outcome contingency method is impaired, and they continue to take risks after a series of losses.

Mental health disorders
 Treatment of mental disorders broad article on treatments frequently mentioning brain dysfunction.
 Acalculia (calculation difficulties)  A decrease in cognitive capacity for calculation that results from damage to the brain.
 CCK-4 a compound that reliably causes severe anxiety symptoms when administered to humans in a dose of as little as 50μg, and is commonly used in scientific research to induce panic attacks
 Thalamocortical radiations fibers between the thalamus and the cerebral cortex. Thalamocortical dysrhythmia is a term associated with spontaneously recurring low frequency spike-and-wave activity in the thalamus, which causes symptoms normally associated with impulse control disorders such as obsessive compulsive disorder, Parkinson's disease, attention deficit hyperactivity disorder, and other forms of chronic psychosis

Physical interventions

This section covers man's attempts to physically alter the brain state to relieve suffering, address atypical functioning or improve performance.

Surgery
 Neurosurgery requires extensive imaging, mapping and exceedingly precise surgical control to minimize collateral damage.
 Robotic surgery, Computer-assisted surgery,
 Stereotactic surgery – uses a three-dimensional coordinate system to locate small targets inside the brain for ablation, biopsy, lesion, injection, stimulation, implantation, radiosurgery, etc.
 Neuropathology – biopsy of tissue from the brain and spinal cord to aid in diagnosis of disease.
 Frequent neurosurgery procedures include: Craniotomy, Craterization, burr hole, Trepanning, Decompressive craniectomy, Radiosurgery, Stereotactic surgery, Transsphenoidal surgery, Intracranial pressure monitoring
 Other, less frequent procedures include: Lobotomy, and various other forms of Psychosurgery.
 Specific regions frequently requiring surgical attention include: Supratentorial region, Infratentorial region, and the pituitary gland (see listing under structure)
 Conditions frequently treated with invasive procedures: Brain tumor, Grading of the tumors of the central nervous system, Cerebral hemorrhage, Subdural hematoma, Aneurysm, Hydrocephalus ("water on the brain"), Cerebral shunt, Meningioma (tumors), Pituitary adenoma (tumor in the pituitary gland), Skull fracture and Cranioplasty (correcting a defect or deformity of the skull).

Radiation
 Stereotactic radiosurgery (discussed in Stereotactic surgery) utilizes multiple radiation beams converging at a tumor typically often done as an outpatient procedure requiring three visits to a highly qualified radiation oncology department. The converged beams allow a very high amount of radiation to be focused on a tumor with cure rates comparable to surgical removal.
 Brain radiation therapy (discussed in Radiation therapy) is often used in addition to surgical removal of tumors.

Chemotherapy
 Chemotherapy – the use of drugs to kill or alter cancer cells. Chemotherapy is not an effective initial treatment for low-grade brain tumors, mostly because standard chemotherapy drugs cannot pass through the blood-brain barrier. Chemotherapy for brain tumors is typically administered following surgery or radiation therapy. Local delivery (placement of the drugs within or around the brain tumor) is typically necessary. Injection into cerebrospinal fluid is also a less invasive possibility.
 Post-chemotherapy cognitive impairment – (also known as chemotherapy-induced cognitive dysfunction, chemo brain, or chemo fog) describes the cognitive impairment that impacts approximately 20–30% of people who undergo general chemotherapy.

Electrical
 Cortical stimulation mapping direct electrical stimulation of the cerebral cortex (invasive) to elicit a response which is mapped. One use, where it remains the preferred method, is the pre-surgical mapping of the motor cortex and language areas to prevent unnecessary functional damage during surgery. It is also used in the treatment of some forms of epilepsy.
 Electroconvulsive therapy – formerly known as electroshock, ETC is a controversial psychiatric treatment in which seizures are electrically induced in anesthetized patients for potential therapeutic effect. The mode of action is unknown. Usage is typically restricted for severe depression that has not responded to other treatments, and for mania and catatonia. According to a 1980 study it was estimated that 100,000 people receive ECT in the U.S. annually. 70% are women. Typically the electrical stimulus is about 800 milliamps for up to several hundred watts, delivered in flows between one and six seconds. Its administered three times a week, on alternate days, over a course of two to four weeks (6 to 12 procedures.) Deaths from the procedure are approximately 4 per 100,000 procedures (24-48 deaths per 100,000 patients). Efficacy of treatment is subject to question and remission rates are high. Side effects are common and include both retrograde (for events occurring before the treatment) and anterograde (for events occurring after the treatment) amnesia, and other substantial cognitive distortions.

Physical exercise
 Neurobiological effects of physical exercise

Other
Ten percent of brain myth – see refutation section
Mobile phone radiation and health – in 2007 European Commission" finds exposure to RF fields is unlikely to lead to an increase in cancer in humans".
Brain size overall brain size and the size of substructures have been analyzed. Questions of links between size and functioning – particularly intelligence – have often proved controversial. Brain size is sometimes measured by weight and sometimes by volume.
 Organization for Human Brain Mapping
 Common misconceptions about the brain
 Brain Mapping Foundation

Case histories
 Brain injuries and subsequent interventions are frequently studied in depth. Probably the most famous case is Phineas Gage.
 Other significant cases include: Gary Dockery, Ahad Israfil, KC (patient), Robert Lawrence (British Army officer), Henry Molaison, Terry Wallis, and Zasetsky.
 Devin Galligan underwent a special form of brain mapping surgery paired with sophisticated anesthesiology techniques whereby the patient is in a deep sleep during the first phase, but is awakened later during the surgery to perform a series of tests to help guide surgeons through the rugged pathways of the brain
 List of notable brain tumor patients

See also 

 Outline of brain mapping
 Outline of human anatomy
 Outline of neuroscience
 List of regions in the human brain

References

External links 

 Atlas of the Human Brain
 The Whole Brain Atlas
 High-Resolution Cytoarchitectural Primate Brain Atlases
 Brain Facts and Figures
 Interactive Human Brain 3D Tool

 
Human brain
Human brain